The men's 1500 meter at the 2017 KNSB Dutch Single Distance Championships took place in Heerenveen at the Thialf ice skating rink on Thursday 29 December 2016. There were 20 participants.

Statistics

Result

Source:

Referee: Dina Melis. Assistant: Loretta Staring  Starter: Raymond Micka 
Start: 18:22 hr. Finish: 18:51 hr.

Draw

References

Single Distance Championships
2017 Single Distance